Kador Ben-Salim was a Senegalese-Soviet acrobat, Red Army soldier and most likely the only actor of African descent in Soviet film throughout the 1920s and early 1930s.  A veteran of the civil war, he appeared in at least eight films, including The Return of Nathan Becker, the first ever Yiddish-language sound film.

Biography 
Ben-Salim was an acrobat in a touring Moroccan troupe that arrived in Moscow in 1912.  By 1916, he had made his way to Almaty and joined a circus troupe run by Alexander Sosin (the first person to do a front double somersault).  Following the Russian Revolution and the start of the civil war, he joined the Red Army and served in one of the international cavalry units under the divisional command of Vasily Chapayev.

Filmography

References

Notes

Sources

Soviet actors
Senegalese actors